Vassfjellet is a mountain on the border of the municipalities of Melhus and Trondheim in Trøndelag county, Norway. The eastern side of the mountain hosts a ski resort, Vassfjellet Skisenter.

A road leading to the top has been built for maintenance access to the tower. This road starts in the village of Kvål in Melhus, but is closed to public vehicle access. It is however an excellent route for hiking.

The Vassfjell Chapel is located on the northeast side of the mountain in Klæbu.

Name
The first element is the genitive case of vatn which means "water", "lake", or "tarn" and the last element is the finite form of fjell which means "mountain". (There is a small tarn near the top of Vassfjellet.)

See also
 List of tallest structures in Norway

References

Mountains of Trøndelag
Klæbu
Melhus